Albert Montañés was the defending champion, but chose to compete in the Serbia Open instead.
Juan Martín del Potro defeated Fernando Verdasco 6–2, 6–2 to claim his 2nd title this year since rehabilitating from wrist surgery, and his first on clay in nearly three years. It was Del Potro's ninth career title.

Seeds
The top four seeds received a bye into the second round.

Qualifying

Draw

Finals

Top half

Bottom half

References
Main Draw

Estoril Open - Singles
2011 Men's Singles
Estoril Open